The Dart River arises in the Kahurangi National Park between the Lookout and Hope Ranges in the Tasman Region of New Zealand. It flows northward to join the Wangapeka River, which is a tributary of the Motueka River.

References

Rivers of the Tasman District
Kahurangi National Park
Rivers of New Zealand